Sebastiaan Brebels (born 5 May 1995) is a Belgian professional footballer who plays as a midfielder for Lierse Kempenzonen.

Career
Born in Aalst, Brebels played with Dender, Gent, R.S.C. Anderlecht and Zulte-Waregem as a junior. He made his first team debut with S.V. Zulte Waregem on 17 December 2014 in the Belgian Cup in a 0–3 home defeat against Anderlecht. He played 67 minutes, before being substituted by Charni Ekangamene.

On 21 January 2021, he moved to KA in Iceland.

Brebels returned to Belgium on 28 June 2022, signing with Lierse Kempenzonen.

References

External links

1995 births
Sportspeople from Aalst, Belgium
Footballers from East Flanders
Living people
Belgian footballers
Association football midfielders
S.V. Zulte Waregem players
Cercle Brugge K.S.V. players
Lommel S.K. players
Knattspyrnufélag Akureyrar players
Lierse Kempenzonen players
Belgian Pro League players
Challenger Pro League players
Úrvalsdeild karla (football) players
Belgian expatriate footballers
Expatriate footballers in Iceland
Belgian expatriate sportspeople in Iceland